Leng Chunhui (born 3 July 1972) is a Chinese judoka. She competed at the 1992 Summer Olympics and the 1996 Summer Olympics.

References

External links
 

1972 births
Living people
Chinese female judoka
Olympic judoka of China
Judoka at the 1992 Summer Olympics
Judoka at the 1996 Summer Olympics
People from Liaoning
Sportspeople from Liaoning
People from Jinzhou
Judoka at the 1994 Asian Games
Asian Games medalists in judo
Asian Games silver medalists for China
Medalists at the 1994 Asian Games
20th-century Chinese women
21st-century Chinese women